Joseph Corfe (1740–1820) was an English Church singer and organist, known also as a composer.

Life
He was born in Salisbury, son of Joseph Corfe (born 1705), into a musical family. He had a musical education from John Stephens, organist of Salisbury Cathedral, and became his apprentice. He was a lay vicar of the cathedral. On 21 February 1783 he was appointed one of the gentlemen of the Chapel Royal, Windsor.  He became the Salisbury Cathedral organist in 1792.

Works
Corfe's major work was a volume of church music, containing a well-known service in B flat, and anthems. He wrote also glees, mainly arranged from familiar melodies. Other works were selections of sacred musical compositions, a Treatise on Singing (1799), and Thorough-bass Simplified (1806).

Family
Corfe in 1766 married Mary Barnard; they had six children. Their son Arthur Thomas Corfe took over as organist of Salisbury Cathedral in 1804. Their son John David Corfe (1804–1876) was for many years the organist for Bristol Cathedral.

References

External links
 
Attribution

1740 births
1820 deaths
Cathedral organists
English classical composers
People from Salisbury